The Scottish Rally Championship is a rallying series run throughout Scotland over the course of a year, that comprises seven gravel surface events.

The 2018 series began in the snow-covered forest tracks around Inverness on 10 February, with the season finale taking place around Castle Douglas on 8 September.

Aberdeen based haulage company ARR Craib were the championship sponsors for the sixth year in a row.

Driver Euan Thorburn and regular co-driver Paul Beaton who won the 2017 championship did not contest the 2018 championship.

Following the Galloway Hills Rally in September, driver Andrew Gallacher and co-driver Jane Nicol were declared 2018 champions in their Ford Focus WRC.

2018 calendar
For season 2018 there was to be seven events held predominantly on gravel surfaces.

Border Counties Rally: On 2 March it was announced by press release that the 2018 event would be postponed. This was due to severe winter weather in the area on the weekend prior to the expected date of 10 March that would impede the stage preparation. Organisers were in talks with the SRC to make alternative arrangements however no date could be agreed and the event was abandoned for 2018.

2018 events podium

Drivers Points Classification

Points are awarded to the highest placed registered driver on each event as follows: 30, 28, 27, 26, and so on down to 1 point. 
At the end of the Championship, competitors will count their best 5 scores out of the 6 events as his/her final overall Championship score.

References

External links
 
 RSAC Scottish Rally Homepage

Scottish Rally Championship seasons
Scottish Rally Championship
Scottish Rally Championship
Scottish Rally Championship